Degrassi Junior High was the second series in the Degrassi franchise, and ran on CBC on from 18 January 1987 to 27 February 1989. The series centers around an ethnically and economically diverse group of adolescents attending the fictional Degrassi Junior High School in east end Toronto, as they deal with various issues including teenage pregnancy, abuse, and sexuality. The eleventh episode of the first season, It's Late, won an International Emmy Award.

Principal photography began on Degrassi Junior High in July 1986, and finished in December 1988.

Episodes

Season 1 (1987)
The first season is set during the first half of the school year. Notable characters such as Joey Jeremiah and Christine Nelson are in Grade 8, while Caitlin Ryan is in Grade 7.

Season 2 (1988)

Season 3 (1988–1989)

Specials

See also 
 The Kids of Degrassi Street
 Degrassi: School's Out, the made-for-television follow-up movie to the series
 List of Degrassi: The Next Generation episodes

References 

Lists of Canadian children's television series episodes
Lists of Canadian drama television series episodes